Zvimba District is a district of Mashonaland West Province, Zimbabwe.

Location
The district is located in Mashonaland West Province, in central northern Zimbabwe. Zvimba District is bordered by Guruve District to the north, Mazowe District to the east, the city of Harare to the southeast, Chegutu District to the south, Kadoma District to the southwest and Makonde District to the west and northwest.

History of Chief Zvimba mtorashanga
The Zvimba chieftainship was founded by Neuteve Chihobvu who migrated from Guru Uswa. When he arrived in the area now known as Zvimba he complained that his feet were swollen, (Nda zvimba makumbo). He was thereafter called Zvimba. The land now called Zvimba then belonged to the Rozvi tribe then headed by Tambare. Tambare allocated the land to Neuteve (Zvimba). Neuteve became the first chief Zvimba.

Overview
Zvimba District is primarily a farming and ranching district. Crops raised include tobacco, maize and cotton. Cattle are raised for dairy products and beef.

Education
A fair number of primary and secondary schools are located in Zvimba District, the most well-known being a private, selective school called Cornway College in Mt. Hampden on the outskirts of Zvimba and in very close proximity to Harare.
Kutama College previously known as (St Francis Xavier College) is an all-boys high school located near the town of Norton in the Zvimba area, 80 kilometres southwest of the Zimbabwean capital Harare.

Population
The current population of Zvimba District is 263 020 according to the last census of 2012. Of this population 50. 2 per cent are male while females constitute the remaining 49.8 per cent. By population size, Zvimba Rural District is the second largest in Mashonaland West after Hurungwe and has 17.5 per cent of the total provincial population. The 2017 ZimStats population projections state that by 2020 Zvimba will have around 161 660 males and 155 931 females respectively.

Notable people
 James Chikerema
 Sabina Mugabe
 Tobaiwa Mudede
 Faber Chidarikire
 Robert Gabriel Mugabe
 Thompson Samkange
 Stanlake J. W. T. Samkange
 August Msarurgwa

See also
 Districts of Zimbabwe
 Provinces of Zimbabwe

References

 
Districts of Mashonaland West Province